Enthusiast computing refers to a group of people who build high-end personal computers that facilitate gaming, stock trading, video editing, music creation and editing, photograph editing, programming, remote work, cryptocurrency mining, and other hardware-intensive applications.

Elements of an enthusiast computer may include cutting edge CPU(s), GPU(s), screen(s), cooling devices, cases, motherboard(s), input devices, computer memory, computer storage, virtual reality headsets, network cards, haptics, power supplies, and peripheral devices.

Many manufacturers address this market by producing state of the art offerings which can then be integrated into a custom build.

Influence of gaming

Games have historically been the driving force behind the rapid pace of consumer hardware development. For example, The 7th Guest and Myst helped drive the adoption of CD-ROMs. Intel and AMD both incorporated instruction sets such as MMX, 3DNow!, and Streaming SIMD Extensions into their processors to support the PC's growing role as a home entertainment device.

More recently, however, other types of applications have piqued the interest of computing enthusiasts. Scientific distributed computing tools such as Folding@home, GIMPS, and SETI@home, along with other computationally intensive tasks, including cryptocurrency mining, may also push CPUs and GPUs to their limits, and may also serve as a means of competition, such as tracking how many data sets a user has completed.

Costs
An enthusiast PC implies the early adoption of new hardware, which is sold at a premium price. As an example, the video card ATI Radeon 9700 Pro was released at US$399 in 2002. Many gaming PCs support the use of multiple video cards in SLI or CrossFire, making it possible to spend thousands of dollars in graphics cards alone.

Beyond a certain level of performance, price increases dramatically while offering smaller increases in performance; this is a classic example of diminishing returns. For example, a user who purchased three Nvidia Titan X graphics cards in 2015 would have spent over $4000, while 2016's high-end graphics card offering from Nvidia, the GTX 1080, in three-way SLI would offer a significant increase in performance at less than half the price.

Hardware description

Case, power supply, cooling, and other case accessories 

As well as the computing components themselves, case and related accessories often form a target for enthusiast attention, for functional and aesthetic reasons.

Computer cases 
Computer cases, especially of gaming computers, are often selected with care, for their aesthetic and functional value. Functionally, the case must be able to provide cooling for high-end, possibly overclocked components, and have room for expansion and customization. Aesthetically, case modding usually includes features that show off the creator's intent: clear sides to reveal the internal components and layout, which may be adorned with LEDs, images on the graphics cards or power supply units.

Computer power supplies 
Computer power supplies may be selected for very high quality electrical stability and performance, so that the high speed electronics reliant on them will not suffer from irregularities or disruption, and so that high power processors and graphics cards can be properly supplied with the often high levels of current needed. Power supply reviews for enthusiasts may, for example, take apart the item to identify the exact manufacturers of components, the types and sources of capacitors or power regulation circuitry involved, the quality of PCB soldering, and the calibre of any wiring.

Cooling systems 
Cooling systems may receive careful attention, both to ensure high quality airflow and reduced operating temperatures under heavy workloads or intense activity, to support overclocking, and as part of quiet computing as well.

Water cooling 
Water cooling, in which a water is used to cool a part of the computer, is becoming cheaper and more available. While much more expensive than an ordinary fan, it transfers heat more efficiently and is generally quieter. As building a computer becomes more of an enthusiast activity, due to the rise of tablets, laptops, and cell phones, more cases appeal to water cooling setups.

Quiet computing 
Quiet computing is a specialist aspect of enthusiast activity, whereby the user aims to ensure the computer runs very quietly, with the goal of enjoyable ambience. Fans, hard drives, and any other noisy components may be selected for their acoustic properties, and then mounted in ways that dampen vibration and provide acoustic isolation.

Motherboard 
The motherboard is the circuit board to which nearly all components and peripherals are connected to. It also houses the externally-accessible USB, Ethernet, audio, and display ports, which can be used to connect different peripherals. Every hardware component is connected to the motherboard in some way. Storage drives connect to a motherboard's SATA or M.2 ports and sometimes receive power directly from the motherboard. Video cards are typically seated in a PCIe slot in the motherboard, and receive up to 75 watts of power from it. In modern systems, the power supply typically has a 24-pin cable that plugs directly into the motherboard. The CPU is seated in the CPU tray, and is connected by the motherboard to PCIe lanes, which in turn connect the processor to other hardware components. All case fans and coolers connect to headers on the motherboard, as do the case's LED, reset, and power button cables, and RAM is seated in the motherboard's DIMM slots. Motherboards' compatibility with other components is determined primarily by its CPU socket type, which must be compatible with the processor intended for use, and its chipset.

Central processing unit 

The CPU is mainly responsible for computing physics, AI and central game processes. Modern gaming PCs use high-end processors. With the rise of multi-threaded games, multi-core processor setups have become more necessary, providing better performance by offloading work to all available cores at once. Furthermore, an ample amount of L2 Cache within the CPU, generally 4 MB or more, is recommended to reap the benefits of even faster game performance. In addition, a gaming processor should be capable of running at least the SSE3 instruction set extension, which is available with CPUs produced since at least 2006.

Graphics 

Gaming PCs use hardware accelerated video cards which offer high-end rasterisation-based rendering/image quality. A graphics card is the most important component, being the main determining factor of the capabilities of a gaming PC. Memory capacity on 3D cards is usually at least 256 MB to 12 GB. The amount of video RAM is more important while gaming in higher resolution or using high resolution textures, and/or with extensive modding. Having at least 2GB to 4GB of VRAM or more is suggested for today's standards when gaming. The type of memory used, however, is an important factor. The current VRAM standards are GDDR5, GDDR5X, GDDR6, GDDR6X and HBM2. VRAM standards meaning the type of memory used in the cards manufacturing. GDDR5 and GDDR6 are generations of GDDR, whereas the GDDR5x and 6x variants denote a speed increase over their non-x counterparts. HBM2 memory is generally slower however it comes with the benefit of having massive capacities. Modern graphics cards use the PCI Express expansion slot. Two or more graphics cards can be used simultaneously on motherboards supporting SLI or ATI CrossFire technology, for Nvidia and AMD based cards respectively. Both technologies allow for between two and four graphics cards, although Nvidia recommends only using multiples of the same model, to be used in unison to process and render an image. However, the technologies that allowed for the use of multiple graphics cards in tandem have largely been phased out. As of 2021, only Nvidia's NVLink remains and at that, only on one of their top-of-the-line models, the GeForce RTX 3090 and the GeForce RTX 3090 Ti. The decline of these technologies are largely due to the decrease in support for multiple cards in applications and indeed, games, as well as the decrease in returns on investment, or in other words, consumers were paying a heavy premium for little to no improvement, or in some cases, even performance decrease.

A high-end graphics card will also use more electricity, or have a higher power draw, than a lower-end card. This power draw only increases as the number of graphics cards increases, adding another cost to a high-end computer. Overclocking a graphics card, or multiple, also adds additional power draw. However, as the number of graphics cards increases, the performance gains by adding another graphics card decreases significantly due to the complexity of more than two GPUs communicating to each other in an efficient way. This is another example of depreciating returns.

Memory 

Random access memory, or RAM, acts as a cache for non-graphical resources that games use. Enthusiasts will often purchase the fastest RAM, which has a lower latency, thus offering negligible performance increases in most cases. For gaming, a higher frequency of memory than would be necessary for an average computer user can offer some benefits. This has led to certain motherboards supporting RAM overclocking, with the new XMP standard. As RAM frequency is increased, however, the stability of the system decreases, increasing the risk of random computer shutdowns.

8 GB is usually the recommended amount of memory for gaming computers, as some 64-bit games can use over 4 GB of RAM. Most gaming PCs as of the early 2020s have at least 8 GB of RAM.

While 16 GB of RAM is often considered a sweet spot for gaming, 32 GB of RAM is increasingly used for future-proofing.

The current maximum amount supported on consumer hardware is 128 GB (for quad-channel configuration), with 8 slots on some LGA 2066 motherboards, each slot supporting up to a 16 GB DIMM.

Storage 

In gaming PCs, it is desirable to have fast hard drives, which will generally result in shorter loading times in games. For this reason, some gaming PCs use certain RAID setups to lower latency and increase throughput to mass storage. Since the space taken up by games is nominal compared to the total availability on modern hard drives, speed is preferred over capacity.

Solid-state drives have become popular in recent times, which offer significantly higher speeds than mechanical hard drives. Originally more expensive than hard disk drives, over time, prices have significantly dropped. The performance of SSDs is now considered a minimum, and some consider them necessary even in budget PCs.

Currently, NVMe drives have become the standard for fast storage. These drives connect straight into the motherboard, allowing for extremely fast data read and write speed. These drives are very fast and most NVMe PCIe drives easily surpass the speed of SATA and M.2 SSDs.

Audio 

While sound hardware is usually integrated onto modern gaming motherboards, gaming PCs can also be equipped with a dedicated sound card and speakers in a 5.1 or 7.1 surround sound configuration. A speaker setup or a set of quality headphones is required to enjoy the advanced sound found in most modern computer games. Sound cards have hardware accelerated technologies, such as EAX. The Sound Blaster X-Fi, with its Fatal1ty editions having 64 MB of onboard RAM (unmatched for a sound card), targets enthusiasts as its main demographic, having a dedicated "gaming mode".

Dedicated sound cards have largely died out in popularity, however, due to many modern motherboards now supporting onboard audio, which is considered perfectly acceptable for most use cases. The decline of sound cards started with the introduction of the new millennium. From 2000-2007 the market for these cards collapsed 80%, greater than the 2007-2008 financial decline that had happened in the latter part of the decade.

Peripherals

Display 

A fast response time and high refresh rate is desired in order to display smooth motion. A framerate of 60 frames per second (FPS) is generally the minimum acceptable framerate in a video game for enthusiasts, with some enthusiasts preferring 144 FPS or in some cases 165 FPS, to match the refresh rate of their monitor (144 Hz or 165 Hz, respectively). Some gaming monitors can be overclocked to achieve higher refresh rates. Gaming with multiple monitors is possible, but this is not a feature supported by all games. Many players game using three monitors, which increases the load on the graphics card threefold.

Some monitors are designed exclusively for gamers, featuring higher refresh rates and improved response times at the expense of a lower resolution. E-sports, or competitive gamers, often favor higher framerates at the expense of reduced color accuracy, preferring TN panels over IPS panels.

Interface 

There are many hardware interfaces designed specifically for gaming. Such interfaces include keyboards and mice built for gaming (these typically include additional keys or buttons for game-related functions as well as LCD screens, higher sensitivity (for mice), lower input latency, higher durability (structural and more switch actuations before breaking), better adherence (for keyboards and mice) and less/more friction depending on the user's needs), joysticks, gamepads, steering wheels, PC-compatible airplane gauges and panels, etc. A keyboard and mouse is the preferred control method for most games, giving the best speed and accuracy. Touch screens are rarely used for PC gaming at this point. "Haptic feedback" commonly known as force feedback, allows for greater immersion in games played. While there are no keyboards that support haptic feedback, some mice and most forms of game controllers do.

Networking 

While typical computers, including high-end systems, tend to use wireless connections to connect to other computers as well as a router, gaming PCs often use Ethernet cables for the fastest and most reliable connection possible. Some companies sell dedicated network cards to reduce lag in multiplayer games. A dial-up Internet connection is not an acceptable solution due to the very high latency (~400ms is common). Mobile broadband connections can also cause the same undesirable effects as dial-up connections, but can be considered less substantial, with latency of or exceeding 150ms, less than 100ms being desirable in a first-person shooter.

Performance and benchmarks

As a general guideline, enthusiast PCs must achieve high scores on 3D benchmarks such as 3DMark when first built or upgraded. Enthusiasts who understand how to overclock sometimes do so to prolong the usefulness of their hardware. The highest results are always achieved by overclocking.

However, synthetic benchmark results rarely equate to real application performance, as measured by framerate. The framerate is measured in frames per second, which refers to the number of times the video card recalculates the image shown on screen. While framerates above 60 FPS (standard NTSC framerate) become increasingly difficult to distinguish with the human eye, enthusiast PCs with a multi-video card setup often boast framerates in excess of 100 FPS. To maintain a challenge, the standard for comparison is constantly refreshed with new games and higher detail settings.

Overclocking

Overclocking is used by enthusiasts to achieve component or system performance that exceeds the manufacturer's officially stated specification. Overclocking is a significant part of enthusiast culture, with popular and widely respected websites such as Anandtech and Tom's Hardware often including overclocking as part of a review. Hardware manufacturers release high-end components that facilitate overclocking. Examples include CPUs with unlocked multipliers, oversized heatsinks or water cooling, and motherboards with user-configurable voltages and incremental bus speeds. "Professional" overclockers commonly overclock only one core of processors, typically older AMD CPUs, to obtain CPU speeds well beyond the ability of the official configuration.

Some system builders and part manufacturers now offer factory overclocking, which is covered under warranty. Alternatively a manufacturer or user may seek individual components that overclock, in order to buy a cheaper product that will prove to run to a higher quality product's standard.

Risks 
There are significant hazards to be aware of when overclocking a computer. At a mundane level some components will not work under too high a demand, and the computer will not work until  overclocking is reduced or disabled entirely. More seriously, some components may be damaged or destroyed by increased heat or voltages routinely caused by overclocking if the user is reckless or uninformed, and therefore caution and some level of prior understanding is needed.

In particular, overclocked CPUs (central processing units) generally run hotter than normal, and components such as CPUs, memory controllers, graphics cards and RAM may require higher voltages to produce higher performance. The higher voltage results in increased heat and can stress the electrical channels of the components. This can cause damage, degradation, or critical failure.

Benefits 
While most components usually see marginal or barely perceptible benefits, CPUs see much larger performance improvements, especially when using a high-end cooling solution. However, CPUs are also the most complex component to overclock, making it significantly harder for newcomers and beginners to achieve good results.

GPUs (Graphics processing units) on the other hand, while able to be overclocked, rarely see significant performance gains, while results can be wildly inconsistent. "The Silicon lottery" is a term used by overclocking enthusiasts to describe components that turned out better during the manufacturing process, therefore making them more durable (less commonly, this can also be the case with CPUs), capable of handling the pressure of overclocking better, resulting in more overclocking headroom. GPUs are the most popular component to overclock despite downsides.

In terms of complexity, RAM (Random-access memory) is closely tied with CPUs, but performance gains are not as significant. In particular, DDR4 SDRAM is more prominent compared to its predecessors DDR3 and DDR2. However, even though higher speeds aren't usually very noticeable in most applications there are a few scenarios where overclocking RAM is legitimately important. One such scenario is with AMD Accelerated Processing Units where the CPU and GPU are combined in one chip, meaning they have to share memory resources. Typically, a GPU has its own RAM that is much faster than desktop DDR3 or DDR4 SDRAM, but with an APU it has to work with slower desktop RAM. In this particular scenario, overclocking RAM is highly recommended, giving meaningful performance increases.

See also
 Homebuilt computer
 Portable desktop
 Overclocking
 PC Master Race
 Streamer
 SFF Enthusiast

References

Personal computing